Arthur Webster Emerson (December 5, 1885 – July 18, 1968) was a painter who was born in Honolulu, Kingdom of Hawai'i. He was the son of Nathaniel Bright Emerson, and grandson of missionaries John S. Emerson and Ursula Newell Emerson. As a young Hawaiian-born artist, he was encouraged in his painting by Madge Tennent. During the 1910s and 1920s, he painted in New York with other young artists associated with the Ashcan School.  Emerson died in 1968.

References
 Falk, Peter Hastings (Editor) Who Was Who in American Art, 1564-1975, New Providence, NJ, Marquis Who's Who, 1999, p. 3724.
 Fielding, Mantle & Glenn B. Opitz (Editor), Dictionary of American Painters, Sculptors & Engravers, Poughkeepsie, NY, Apollo, 1986, p. 1081.
 Mallett, Daniel Trowbridge, Index of Artists, International-Biographical; Including Painters, Sculptors, Illustrators, Engravers and Etchers of the Past and the Present, New York, P. Smith, 1935, p. 1130.
 Marlor, Clark S., The Society of Independent Artists, The Exhibition Record 1917-1944, Park Ridge, N.J., Noyes Press, 1984, p. 600.
 Severson, Don R. Finding Paradise: Island Art in Private Collections, University of Hawaii Press, 2002, p. 123-4.

External links
 Arthur Webster Emerson on AskArt.com
 Smithsonian American Art Museum, Art Inventories Catalog

Footnotes

1885 births
1968 deaths
20th-century American painters
American male painters
Artists from Hawaii
20th-century American male artists